Muara Beach is a beach in Muara, Mukim Serasa, Brunei-Muara District, Brunei. The beach used to be stretched up to Pelumpong Spit, before they were cut apart in order to make way for easy access to Muara Port in the 1960s. The beach is located at an estimated distance of 27 km from Bandar Seri Begawan, and 3 km from Muara Port.

History 
On June 10, 1945, an amphibious assault was carried out at Green Beach (code for Muara Beach) during the Battle of Brunei, by the 2/15th and 2/17th Battalions of the Australian Army in then Japan-occupied Brunei. A war memorial was built on the beach in honor of this assault.

The 11 hectare Muara Beach Recreational Park was officially opened in 2006. It consisted of a 1.2 km track, volleyball field, beach football field, camping site and many more. On January 2, 2022, the Taipei Economic and Cultural Office (TECO) organized a beach cleaning campaign.

References

Brunei-Muara District
Beaches of Brunei